Michael Ebo Dankwa (born 14 May 1960) is a Ghanaian boxer. He competed in the men's light flyweight event at the 1984 Summer Olympics.

References

1960 births
Living people
Ghanaian male boxers
Olympic boxers of Ghana
Boxers at the 1984 Summer Olympics
Place of birth missing (living people)
Light-flyweight boxers